Major-General Sir William Ernest Victor Abraham  (21 August 1897 – 6 February 1980) was a British Army officer who served in India and Burma during the Second World War. He was nicknamed 'WEVA'.

Early life and education
Sir William was born in Enniskillen and educated at Methodist College Belfast and the Royal College of Science, Dublin.

Military service
He visited Burma and India as a geologist from 1920 to 1937 with the Burmah Oil Company. Abraham also commanded the Upper Burma Battalion of the Burma Auxiliary Force from 1932 to 1937 as lieutenant-colonel.  In 1940, during World War II, he rejoined the army as a second lieutenant in the Royal Engineers after the War Office asked him to analyse the events in France. He then attended the Staff College, Camberley. He was awarded an OBE and mentioned in dispatches twice for his service in the Middle East. His actions in Tunisia resulted in him being appointed a CBE in 1942.

He was promoted to the acting rank of major-general in 1945. In 1945 Sir William was Comptroller General of Military Economy in India.

His report, Summary of the economic developments in the Far East during the six months ending 30th June, 1944 is held in the Liddell Hart Centre for Military Archives, King's College London.

Later career
He worked as managing director of Burmah Oil Company until 1955. From 1962 until 1977 Sir William was national chairman of the Burma Star Association. He was knighted in the 1977 Queen's Silver Jubilee and Birthday Honours List. He was elected as a Fellow of the Indian National Science Academy in 1936.

Personal life
Sir William married Susan Jeanette Bidwell in 1928. They had one son and two daughters. After Susan's death in 1965, Sir William married Rosemary Eustace. She died, aged 104, in 2019.

See also
List of British generals and brigadiers

References

Bibliography

External links
King's College London research guides.
Generals of World War II

1897 births
1980 deaths
British Army major generals
British Army generals of World War II
Knights Bachelor
Collections of the Liddell Hart Centre for Military Archives
Commanders of the Order of the British Empire
Fellows of the Geological Society of London
People educated at Methodist College Belfast
Royal Engineers officers
Fellows of the Indian National Science Academy
People from Enniskillen
Graduates of the Staff College, Camberley
Military personnel from County Fermanagh